Cymatura nigra is a species of beetle in the family Cerambycidae. It was described by Franz in 1954. It is known from Tanzania, the Democratic Republic of the Congo, Burundi, and Uganda.

References

Xylorhizini
Beetles described in 1954